Ronald Byrd Akana (born September 8, 1928) is an American former flight attendant, who spent 63 years working as cabin crew for United Airlines and who logged an estimated 200 million airmiles. He was the world's longest serving flight attendant and was admitted to The Guinness Book of Records.

Career 
Akana applied due to a local newspaper ad in 1949 aged 21 with United Airlines for a steward position. His reason to apply as a flight steward was that "[…] it meant getting to the mainland, which was a huge deal in those days." At this time Akana was still a student at the University of Hawaii. After joining UA he started flying to the mainland on Boeing Stratocruiser. His time working for UA was only interrupted by a two-year conscription, where he served in the Korean War. In August 2012, after 63 years of service, Akana retired after a flight from Denver to Kauai. By this time he had accumulated 200 million airmiles.

Personal life 
Akana was born on September 8, 1928 in Honolulu. His wife was also a flight attendant, but had to quit after marriage. Their daughter Jean also pursued a career as flight attendant.

References 

1928 births
Living people
Flight attendants
People from Hawaii

American aviation record holders